Ivan Sulim (born 4 May 1989) is a Belarusian former professional footballer.

External links

1989 births
Living people
Belarusian footballers
Association football midfielders
FC Gomel players
FC DSK Gomel players
FC SKVICH Minsk players
FC Rechitsa-2014 players
FC Slavia Mozyr players
FC UAS Zhitkovichi players